Blue Stroll is an album by American jazz multi-instrumentalist Ira Sullivan, which was recorded in 1959 and released on Delmark. He leads a quintet with saxophonist Johnny Griffin, pianist Jodie Christian, bassist Victor Sproles and drummer Wilbur Campbell.

Reception

In his review for AllMusic, Alex Henderson states "Many of Chicago's bop musicians have lamented Sullivan's decision to move to Florida and wish he had never left Chi-Town; listening to the rewarding Blue Stroll, it isn't hard to understand why they feel that way."

The Penguin Guide to Jazz notes about Griffin "who barges and blusters his way through his solos, tossing out tags and quotes as if to remind the others what else was going on in the world."

Track listing
 "Wilbur's Tune" (Wilbur Campbell) – 6:03
 "My Old Flame" (Arthur Johnston, Sam Coslow) – 6:40
 "Blue Stroll" (Jodie Christian) – 5:52
 "63rd Street Theme" (Johnny Griffin) – 7:24 Bonus track on CD
 "Bluzinbee" – 19:46
 "Wilbur's Tune, Alternate" (Wilbur Campbell) – 8:13 Bonus track on CD

Personnel
Ira Sullivan – trumpet, baritone sax, peck horn, alto sax
Johnny Griffin – alto sax, tenor sax, baritone sax
Jodie Christian – piano
Victor Sproles – bass
Wilbur Campbell – drums

References

1961 albums
Ira Sullivan albums
Delmark Records albums